Statistics of Emperor's Cup in the 1950 season.

Overview
It was contested by 16 teams, and All Kwangaku won the championship.

Results

1st Round
Waseda University WMW 4–2 Nagoya Soccer
Nittetsu Futase – (retired) Sapporo Club
Shiun Club 0–3 Kariya Soccer
Urawa Club 0–4 All Kwangaku
Keio University 4–0 Hiroshima Club
Tohoku Representatives (retired) – Kyoto Club
Toyama University Club 1–10 Shida Soccer
Ogaki Soccer 1–5 All Kansai University

Quarterfinals
Waseda University WMW 7–0 Nittetsu Futase
Kariya Soccer 2–4 All Kwangaku
Keio University 3–0 Kyoto Club
Shida Soccer 1–2 All Kansai University

Semifinals
Waseda University WMW 2–4 All Kwangaku
Keio University 2–0 All Kansai University

Final

All Kwangaku 6–1 Keio University
All Kwangaku won the championship.

References
 NHK

Emperor's Cup
1950 in Japanese football